The 2009–10 Colorado State Rams men's basketball team represented Colorado State University in the 2009–10 NCAA Division I men's basketball season. The Rams were led by head coach Tim Miles in his third year leading the team. Colorado State played their home games at Moby Arena in Fort Collins, Colorado, as members of the Mountain West Conference. 

The Rams finished conference play with a 7–9 record, earning the fifth seed in the Mountain West tournament. Colorado State lost in the quarterfinals of the MWC tournament to eventual tournament champion San Diego State.

Colorado State failed to qualify for the NCAA tournament, but were invited to the 2010 College Basketball Invitational. The Rams were eliminated in the first round of the CBI by Morehead State, 74–60.

The Rams finished the season with a 16–16 record.

Roster 

Source

Schedule and results

|-
!colspan=9 style=|Exhibition

|-
!colspan=9 style=|Regular season

|-
!colspan=9 style=| Mountain West tournament

|-
!colspan=9 style=| CBI

References

Colorado State Rams men's basketball seasons
Colorado State
Colorado State
Colorado State men's basketball
Colorado State men's basketball